This is a list of British representatives in Zanzibar from 1841 to 1963. They were responsible for representing British interests in the Sultanate of Zanzibar. From 1913 to 1961 they were also the vizier of the Sultan of Zanzibar.

On 7 November 1890, the United Kingdom proclaimed protectorate over the Sultanate (according to the terms of the Heligoland–Zanzibar Treaty with the German Empire). On 10 December 1963, the United Kingdom terminated its protectorate.

On 12 January 1964, the Sultanate was overthrown in the Zanzibar Revolution, and the People's Republic of Zanzibar was proclaimed. On 26 April 1964, the People's Republic united with mainland Tanganyika to form the United Republic of Tanganyika and Zanzibar, which was later renamed to the United Republic of Tanzania.

List

(Dates in italics indicate de facto continuation of office)

See also

History of Zanzibar
Sultanate of Zanzibar

External links

British representatives in Zanzibar
History of Zanzibar
Zanzibar
Tanzania and the Commonwealth of Nations
Tanzania–United Kingdom relations
British representatives